Triathlon at the 2018 Commonwealth Games was held in the Southport Broadwater Parklands, Gold Coast from April 5 to 7. A total of five events took place, two each for men and women and a mixed relay event. For the first time ever, para-triathlon events were contested at the Commonwealth Games.

Medal table

Medallists

Para-triathlon

Participating nations
There are 24 participating nations in triathlon with a total of 77 athletes.

References

External links
 Results Book – Triathlon

 
2018
2018 in triathlon
2018 Commonwealth Games events
Triathlon competitions in Australia